Big Hit is an album from British EBM group Nitzer Ebb. It was released  by Mute Records in 1995. The album included two singles, "Kick It" and "I Thought". The album is a great departure from the previous albums EBM stylings, featuring a heavy influence from alternative rock and a greater emphasis on more traditional instruments. Big Hit was the band's final release for Mute until its 2006 retrospective, Body of Work.

Critical reception
CMJ New Music Monthly called the album "catchy, sinister and subversive", writing that "it's an 'industrial' album that plays through the whole range of emotions and textures instead of just high-tech rage". The Quietus called the album "unfairly maligned".

Track listing
 "Cherry Blossom" – 5:30
 "Hear Me Say" – 4:07
 "Kick It" – 3:39
 "I Thought" – 5:16
 "Floodwater" – 3:35
 "Bordertalk" – 3:25
 "In Decline" – 5:36
 "Living Out of a Bag" – 5:41
 "Boy" – 4:17
 "Our Own World" – 5:37

Personnel

Nitzer Ebb 
 Douglas Mccarthy - Vocals, composer, guitar, programming
 Bon Harris -  Vocals, composer, bass, guitar, percussion, programming

Production/other 
 Flood - Engineering, guitar, mixing, production, programming
 Al Clay - Production on "Border Talk"
 Dr. Know - Guitar on "Kick It"

References

1995 albums
Mute Records albums
Geffen Records albums
Nitzer Ebb albums